The La Sal Mountains or La Sal Range are a mountain range located in Grand and San Juan counties in the U.S. state of Utah, along the border with Colorado. The range rises above and southeast of Moab and north of the town of La Sal. This range is part of the Manti-La Sal National Forest and the southern Rocky Mountains.

The range contains three clusters of peaks separated by passes. The name of the range dates to Spanish times, when the Sierra La Sal (meaning the "Salt Mountains") was a prominent landmark on the Old Spanish Trail between Santa Fe and Los Angeles.

Geology

The range formed due to intrusion of igneous rocks and subsequent erosion of the surrounding less-resistant sedimentary rocks. The most abundant igneous rocks are porphyritic, with phenocrysts of hornblende and plagioclase: these rocks are called diorite in some accounts but trachyte in at least one other source. Syenite, some containing the unusual mineral nosean, makes up a few percent of the igneous rocks present. Some igneous intrusions have the shapes of laccoliths. The ages of these igneous rocks fall between 25 and 28 million years. The magmas were emplaced into sedimentary rocks with ages from Permian to Cretaceous.

The La Sal Mountains rise high over the surrounding Colorado Plateau. Two other ranges on the Plateau, the Abajo Mountains and the Henry Mountains, formed around igneous intrusions of about the same age. Yet other nearby ranges, such as the Carrizo Mountains and Ute Mountain, formed about otherwise similar intrusions emplaced about 70 million years ago. The formation of these igneous rocks in two distinct time intervals has attracted the interest of scientists seeking explanations for magma production below relatively stable parts of the Earth's crust.

Peaks of the La Sal Mountains

See also
Geyser Pass

References
Jules D. Friedman and A. Curtis Huffman Jr., Coordinators, Laccolith Complexes of Southeastern Utah: Time of Emplacement and Tectonic Setting—Workshop Proceedings, United States Geological Survey Bulletin 2158, 292 pages, 1998. http://pubs.usgs.gov/bul/b2158/B2158.pdf

External links

 Manti La Sal National Forest

Colorado Plateau
Laccoliths
Mountains of Grand County, Utah
Mountains of San Juan County, Utah
Mountain ranges of Utah
Ranges of the Rocky Mountains
Manti-La Sal National Forest